Mount Ida, known variously as Idha, Ídhi, Idi, and Ita (the massif including the mountain is called Psiloritis), is the highest mountain on the island of Crete, with an elevation of . It has the highest topographic prominence of any mountain in Greece. A natural park which includes Mount Ida is a member of UNESCO's Global Geoparks Network.

Located in the Rethymno regional unit, Ida was sacred to the Titaness Rhea in Greek mythology. On its slopes lies one of the caves, Idaion Antron, the Idaean Cave, in which, according to legend, the god Zeus was born. Other legends, however, place his birthplace in Psychro Cave on the Lasithi Plateau.

An archaeobotanical study was conducted that looks at the different plant bases in Minoan villas during the Neo-palatial time period in Crete. There was a rich range of food plants that were found to contain essential nutrients such as carbohydrates, protein and sources of vitamins. The study took place on Mount Ida, at the Minoan villa of Zominthos.

Features
The Psiloritis is located on the water divide between the southern part of Crete, which drains to the Libyan Sea, and the northern basin facing the Aegean Sea. A saddle at 2,321 m  East of the summit connects it with Mount Agathias, while westwards the ridge continues with Mount Stolistra (2,336 m)

The Skinakas Observatory of the University of Crete is located on the secondary peak Skinakas at 1750 m. It has two telescopes including a 1.3 m Modified Ritchey-Chrétien instrument.

The Nida plateau is found to the east of the mountain. On the plateau are some shepherd's huts (mitata) built only of local stones, and used both for shelter and for cheesemaking. On the northeast of the mountain, beneath Skinakas Peak, the site of the observatory, is Vromonero Plateau, the site of a holly and maple grove, with many endemic and endangered species. It, along with the access road through Halasia Gorge, and the starting point at Krousonas, has been defined as a Natura 2000 protected area, Krousonas - Vromonero Idis, ID GR4310009.

Zominthos is a plateau that is located in the northern foothills of Mount Ida. On the plateau is the highest altitude Minoan villa ever found, the Minoan villa of Zominthos.

The Kamares Cave is an Ancient Greek sanctuary located on Mount Ida. During the excavation of the cave, numerous pieces of pottery, like vases, were found in the cave. Based on the condition and pattern of the vases, it is known that the pieces of pottery were crafted by peasants at the time. Typically, Cretan pottery is known to have a polychrome ornament, and a black base. The Kamares Cave was not fully excavated however until 1913. The findings gave real insight into Ancient Greek life in relation to Mount Ida.

Mythology

Dactyls

Ida is the locus for a race of legendary ancient metal workers, the Dactyls.

Idaean Cave

In ancient times the Idaean cave, "cave of the Goddess" (Dea) was venerated by Minoans and Hellenes alike. By Greek times the cave was rededicated to Zeus. The cave where Zeus was nurtured is variously stated to be this cave, or another of the same name, or the Dictaean cave.

Votive seals and ivories have been found in the cave. Like the Dictaean cave, the Idaean cave was known as a place of initiations. It may have served as the site of an oracle, symbolized by the frequent depiction of a tripod on coins of nearby Axos, which presumably controlled the territory around the cave.

Gallery

See also
Idaea
Mount Kedros
List of mountains in Greece

References

External links

  Greek Mountain Flora

Two-thousanders of Greece
Mountains of Crete
Landforms of Rethymno (regional unit)
Landforms of Heraklion (regional unit)
Geography of ancient Crete
Natura 2000 in Greece
Sacred mountains
Rhea (mythology)
Zeus